Uttara Baokar is an Indian stage, film and television actress. She acted in several notable plays, like as Padmavati in Mukyhamantri,  Mena in Mena Gurjari,  Desdemona in Shakespeare's Othello, the mother in playwright Girish Karnad's Tughlaq, the nautch girl in Chhote Saiyad Bade Saiyad and the lead role of Umrao in Umrao Jaan. In 1978, she also directed Jaywant Dalvi's play Sandhya Chhaya, in Hindi translation by Kusum Kumar.

In 1984, she won the Sangeet Natak Akademi Award, India's National Academy for Acting (Hindi theatre). She has also appeared in Marathi films like Doghi (1995) with Sadashiv Amrapurkar and Renuka Daftardar, Uttarayan (2005), Shevri (2006) and Restaurant (2006), with Sonali Kulkarni.

Early life and education
Uttara studied acting at National School of Drama (NSD), Delhi, under Ebrahim Alkazi, graduating in 1968.

Filmography
Yatra (1986)
Tamas (1987)
Ek Din Achanak (1989)
Udaan (TV series) (1990–1991)
Rukmavati Ki Haveli (1991)
The Burning Season (1993)
Doghi (1995) (Marathi)
Sardari Begum (1996)
Thakshak (1999)
Antaral (TV series) (2000)
Zindagi Zindabad (2000)
Kora Kaagaz (2002)
Vaastupurush (2002) (Marathi)
Nazarana (2002) (TV series)
Uttarayan (2003) (Marathi)
Jassi Jaissi Koi Nahin (TV series) (2003–2006)
Shevri (Marathi Film) (2006)
Kashmakash Zindagi Ki (TV series) (2006–2009)
Jabb Love Hua (TV series) (2006–2007)
Restaurant (2006) (Marathi)
Rishtey (TV series) (Season 2)
Sins (2005)
Hum Ko Deewana Kar Gaye (2006)
Dor (2006)
Aaja Nachle (2007)
8 x 10 Tasveer (2009)
Ha Bharat Maza (2011) (Marathi)
Samhita (2013) (Marathi)
Ekkees Toppon Ki Salaami (2014) as Politician's mother
Dev Bhoomi - Land of the Gods (2015) as Priya (Rahul Negi's sister)

Awards
1984 Sangeet Natak Akademi Award for Acting (Hindi theatre).
1988 National Film Award for Best Supporting Actress for Ek Din Achanak

Notes

References

External links
 
 

Indian film actresses
Actresses in Hindi cinema
Indian television actresses
Indian stage actresses
Actresses in Marathi cinema
National School of Drama alumni
Living people
Recipients of the Sangeet Natak Akademi Award
Hindi theatre
Place of birth missing (living people)
Year of birth missing (living people)
20th-century Indian actresses
21st-century Indian actresses
Actresses in Hindi television
Best Supporting Actress National Film Award winners
Special Mention (feature film) National Film Award winners